Nigel Crabtree (born 15 March 1960) is a former speedway rider from England.

Speedway career 
Crabtree rode in the top two tiers of British Speedway from 1977 to 1996, riding for various clubs. In 1987, he finished runner-up in the National League Riders' Championship. He was regarded as one of the leading National League riders at the time, consistently finishing in the top ten averages.

References 

Living people
1960 births
British speedway riders
Glasgow Tigers riders
Hull Vikings riders
Newcastle Diamonds riders
Poole Pirates riders
Scunthorpe Scorpions riders
Sheffield Tigers riders
Stoke Potters riders